Gustavo Adolfo Munúa Vera (born 27 January 1978) is a Uruguayan former footballer who played as a goalkeeper, currently manager of Argentine club Unión de Santa Fe.

After starting out at Nacional he spent most of his professional career in Spain, mainly at Deportivo de La Coruña where he could never be a starter in six seasons. He also played in the country for Málaga and Levante, being first choice and appearing in 151 La Liga matches over one decade.

An Uruguayan international for six years, Munúa represented the country at the 2002 World Cup.

Playing career

Club

Nacional
Born in Montevideo, Munúa started his career at local Club Nacional de Football, where he won four Uruguayan Primera División titles in a row. He held the record of being the first goalkeeper to score in Uruguayan football, when he netted from a free kick in a league win against Central Español.

Munúa later scored three goals from penalties, both in the league and the Copa Libertadores.

Deportivo
Munúa left Nacional in 2003, joining La Liga side Deportivo de La Coruña on a six-year contract, where he struggled to gain first-choice status. From 2003 to 2006 he was topped by Spanish international José Francisco Molina and, subsequently, faced stiff competition from Israel's Dudu Aouate.

In January 2008, after regaining first-choice from Aouate, both goalkeepers were involved in a post-training punching session that resulted in both being suspended for the match against Villarreal CF, as well as subsequent league games. In February, due to B-team goalkeeper Fabri's inexperience, both players were reinstated in the squad, although the Israeli regained his lost spot.

After having started the following season, as Aouate, deemed surplus to requirements, Munúa eventually returned to back-up status, as Aouate was sold to RCD Mallorca and Fabri returned to the reserves. On 25 January 2009, due to the forced absence of new first-choice Dani Aranzubia (sent off the previous week against FC Barcelona), he returned to action for his only appearance of the campaign, a 1–0 loss at Real Madrid.

Málaga and Levante

On 28 June 2009, Munúa signed a one-year deal with Málaga CF. At his new club he was an instant first choice, appearing in all the league games in his first year as the Andalusians barely avoided relegation (17th position).

After only one season, Munúa rejected a new contract offer and was released by the club, on 26 May 2010. On 6 August he signed with Levante UD, returned to the top flight after two years, and he made his official debut on 28 August, in a 1–4 home defeat to Sevilla FC.

Munúa was a starter for the Valencian Community side throughout the vast majority of his spell. However, late into his third season, he, alongside Sergio Ballesteros and Juanlu, was accused by teammate José Barkero of lack of commitment during a 4–0 home loss against Deportivo, which led to several match fixing allegations.

Later years
In January 2014, after a brief spell with ACF Fiorentina which consisted of two UEFA Europa League appearances, the 36-year-old Munúa returned to his country and Nacional.

International
Munúa made his debut for Uruguay aged 20, in a friendly match with Chile on 24 May 1998. As a backup, he represented the nation at the 2001 Copa América and the 2002 FIFA World Cup.

Coaching career
After winning the 2015 national championship with the latter, as team captain, Munúa was announced as Álvaro Gutiérrez's replacement as head coach. The following season, he resigned in June 2016 due to a poor showing in the Clausura tournament.

In December 2016, Munúa was named manager of Ecuador's L.D.U. Quito. He was dismissed at the end of July, having won one of 20 league matches, but also reached the knockout stages of the Copa Sudamericana with victories over Defensor Sporting and Club Bolívar.

On 7 November 2017, Munúa returned to his former club Deportivo as manager of their reserves in the Segunda División B. In his one season in the dugout, the club reached the play-offs where they lost on away goals to Extremadura UD after a 3–3 aggregate draw.

Munúa joined fellow third division side FC Cartagena on 10 July 2018. He again took his team to the post-season, this time being eliminated 3–1 in the semi-finals by SD Ponferradina.

On 22 December 2019, Munúa took advantage of a contract clause allowing him to leave for a top-flight or foreign team, and returned to Nacional for the upcoming season; he mentioned the necessity of being nearer his two teenage children. He was relieved of his job on 15 October 2020, after losing the Apertura final to C.A. Rentistas.

In October 2021, Munúa was hired at Unión de Santa Fe, ranked 14th in the Argentine Primera División.

Club statistics

Managerial statistics

Honours
Nacional
Uruguayan Primera División: 1998, 2000, 2001, 2002, 2014–15

Uruguay
FIFA U-20 World Cup runner-up: 1997

References

External links

Official website  

1978 births
Living people
Uruguayan footballers
Footballers from Montevideo
Association football goalkeepers
Uruguayan Primera División players
Club Nacional de Football players
La Liga players
Deportivo de La Coruña players
Málaga CF players
Levante UD footballers
ACF Fiorentina players
Uruguay under-20 international footballers
Uruguay international footballers
2001 Copa América players
2002 FIFA World Cup players
Uruguayan expatriate footballers
Expatriate footballers in Spain
Expatriate footballers in Italy
Uruguayan expatriate sportspeople in Spain
Uruguayan expatriate sportspeople in Italy
Uruguayan football managers
Uruguayan Primera División managers
Club Nacional de Football managers
L.D.U. Quito managers
Segunda División B managers
FC Cartagena managers
Argentine Primera División managers
Unión de Santa Fe managers
Uruguayan expatriate football managers
Expatriate football managers in Ecuador
Expatriate football managers in Spain
Expatriate football managers in Argentina
Uruguayan expatriate sportspeople in Ecuador
Uruguayan expatriate sportspeople in Argentina